The Grand Circuit, also known as the "Big Wheel", is a group of harness racing stakes races run at various race tracks around the United States. Run on one-mile tracks, it is "the oldest continuing horse-racing series in the United States."

The series was started in 1871 by Colonel Billy Edwards, of Cleveland, Ohio, L.J. Powers of Springfield, Massachusetts, E.A. Buck of Buffalo, New York, and later C.W. Hutchinson of Utica, New York. The first meeting of the Circuit was held in 1873 in Cleveland, followed by races in Springfield, Buffalo, and Utica. It was originally named "The Quadrilateral Trotting Combination," but was renamed when additional legs were added.

In 1914 the Grand Circuit consisted of six tracks: Cleveland, Ohio, Columbus, Ohio, Lexington, Kentucky, Detroit, Michigan, Grand Rapids, Michigan, and Kalamazoo, Michigan. Prior to this there were more, including Providence, Rhode Island, Hartford, Connecticut, Boston, Massachusetts, Salem, New Hampshire, New York City, and Poughkeepsie, New York, but anti-gambling laws during the early part of the 20th century caused them to drop out.

As of 2004 it is run annually on a circuit of 20 tracks.

Current tracks
Source: 
Charlottetown Driving Park
Delaware County Fairgrounds racetrack (1940–present)
Dover Downs
Freehold Raceway
Historic Track (1911, 1927–1942, 1946–present)
Hippodrome de Trois-Rivières
Harrah's Philadelphia
Hoosier Park
Hollywood Gaming at Dayton Raceway (1989–present)
Indiana State Fairgrounds (1926–1941, 1946–present)
Meadowlands Racetrack (1977–present)
The Meadows Racetrack and Casino (1966–present)
Miami Valley Gaming
Mohawk Racetrack (1978–present)
Mohegan Sun Pocono
Northfield Park
Plainridge Park Casino
The Red Mile (1904, 1912–present)
Saratoga Race Course (1942–present)
Eldorado Gaming Scioto Downs
Tioga Downs (2006–present)
Vernon Downs (1954–present)
Western Fair
Yonkers Raceway & Empire City Casino (1899–1890, 1903–1905, 1910, 1913, 1951–present)

Former tracks

Cleveland Driving Park (1871–1904)
Buffalo Driving Park (1871–1878, 1880–1884, 1886–1894, 1898–1902)
Hampden Park (1871–1877, 1880–1881, 1883–1893)
Utica Driving Park (1871–1879, 1881–1884, 1886–1888)
Rochester Driving Park (1875–1895)
Poughkeepsie Driving Park (1875–1877, 1882, 1889–1890, 1894, 1906–1909, 1916, 1918–1922)
Homewood Park (1881–1882, 1884, 1890–1893)
Narragansett Park (1883–1885, 1899–1905, 1907)
Charter Oak Park (1876–1892, 1894, 1897–1925, 1929–1932)
Island Park (1884–1889)
Detroit Driving Club (1886)
Fleetwood Park Racetrack (1888–1890, 1893–1897)
Point Breeze Park (1890–1894)
Hamtramck Park (1893)
Union Park (1894–1896)
Grosse Pointe Track (1894–1917)
Columbus Driving Park (1896–1925)
Indianapolis (1896)
Fort Wayne Driving Park (1896–1898)
Glens Falls Mile Track (1897–1901) 
Readville Race Track (1897–1908, 1910–1912, 1918–1925)
Rigby Park (1898)
Vigo County Fairgrounds (1900–1902)
New York State Fairgrounds Racetrack (1901–1930, 1933–1941)
Chester Park (1901–1906)
Brighton Beach Race Course (1902–1904)
Kenilworth Park Race Track (1903–1908)
North Memphis Driving Park (1904–1905)
Elkwood Park (1908–1909)
Kalamazoo Recreation Park/Exposition Park (1908–1931)
Fort Erie Race Track (1909–1914, 1932–1934)
Forest City Fairgrounds (1909–1939, 1945)
Indianapolis Speedway (1911)
Comstock Park (1911–1915, 1927, 1929–1930)
Pittsburgh Driving Club (1912–1914, 1916)
Rockingham Park (1912–1913, 1932–1934)
Michigan State Fairgrounds Speedway (1912–1914, 1927, 1929)
Windsor Fair Grounds (1913)
Montreal Exposition Grounds (1915)
Piedmont Driving Club (1916–1922, 1925–1928)
Belmont Driving Park (1917–1922)
Maumee Downs (1918–1930, 1932–1941, 1947–1951)
Devonshire Raceway (1923–1924)
Aurora Downs (1925, 1929–1930, 1947–1950)
Ideal Park (1926)
Monroe Driving Park (1926)
Orange County Fair Speedway (1926)
Coney Island Race Track (1929)
Thorncliffe Park Raceway (1931)
London Fairgrounds (1931)
Illinois State Fairgrounds Racetrack (1931–1941, 1946–2015)
Good Time Park (1935–1956)
Ohio State Fairgrounds (1936–1937)
Milwaukee Fairgrounds (1936, 1941–1948)
Kite Track (1936–1939, 1942–1946, 1949)
Reading Fairgrounds (1937–1943, 1946–1955)
Agawam Park (1937–1938)
Mineola Race Track (1940)
Narragansett Park (1940)
Kentucky State Fairgrounds (1940–1941)
Roosevelt Raceway (1941–1987)
Buffalo Raceway (1941, 1966–????)
New Jersey State Fairgrounds (1944–1945)
DuQuoin State Fairgrounds Racetrack (1944–2009)
Santa Anita Park (1946, 1948, 1950, 1952)
Maywood Park (1947–1950)
Hollywood Park (1947, 1949, 1951, 1953–????)
Fairmount Park Racetrack (1949–1950)
Missouri State Fair Speedway (1949–????)
Wolverine Raceway (1951–????)
Hazel Park Raceway (1954–????)
Bay State Raceway (1956–????)
Sportsman's Park (1956–1997)
Arden Downs (1957–1962)
Suffolk Downs (1960)
Rosecroft Raceway (1961–????) 
Baltimore Raceway (1961–????)
Monticello Raceway (1961–????)
Grandview Raceway (1961–????)
Liberty Bell Park Racetrack (1966–1983)
Phoenix Trotting Park (1966)
Pompano Park (1966–2021)
Atlantic City Race Course
Brandywine Raceway (1971–1985)
Garden State Park Racetrack
Los Alamitos Race Course
Freestate Raceway
Batavia Downs

See also
 Harness racing#Important races

References

 
Horse racing